Surinsar Lake is situated  from Jammu city by road, surrounded by hills and dense forests, and has some mythological importance. The Surinsar Mansar Wildlife Sanctuary is located in the midst of both lakes.

The region is populated with abundant fauna, flora, and avifauna. A small island is at the middle of the lake. This island is home to thousands of bats. Due to some religious beliefs, swimming and boating were discouraged, but in recent times there has been extensive development, either in infrastructure or in boating. This has allowed for the opening of recreational options, such as a climbing wall, open theatre, baby and family parks, restaurants, etc. It is becoming the most sought destination of tourists in Jammu region and regularly there are thousands who are travelling to Surinsar Lake .

History
According to Hindu mythology, the origin of this lake is associated with the warrior of Mahabharata, Arjun. It is believed that son of Arjun shot an illustrious arrow on the ground of Mansar and a spring gushed from the land and became Surinsar Lake. Firstly, it was known as Surang Sar and by the time it became Surinsar.

Notes

References

Lakes of Jammu and Kashmir
Tourist attractions in Udhampur district
Lake islands
Ramsar sites in India